Fantadroms is a Latvian children's cartoon by the production company Studio Dauka. It first aired in the Soviet Union in 1985. The show has no dialogue and drama unfolds through pantomime and expressive noises such as grunts, groans, and laughter. This allows the show to cross language barriers.

The episode "Salt" won the Lielais Kristaps award for best animation in 1985, and further episodes were made sporadically until 1995.

In the early 1990s, Streamline Pictures was planning to release Fantadroms in the United States, but it was scrapped because the company thought the series was too bizarre for American audiences and that the person representing it did not actually have the rights to it.

Plot
The main character of the show is a yellow shape-shifting robot called Indriķis XIII, who usually takes the form of a cat. He flies through the universe mediating various disputes between the other characters or saving them from disaster. One recurring dynamic in the show is the love triangle between Indriķis, Receklīte (a flying purple cat-octopus with whom Indriķis is in love), and The Rat (who is in love with Indriķis). Other recurring characters include a cow, two young humans, and an amorphous pink blob.

Episode list

Episodes "Takeoff Field of Fantasy", "The Salt" and "The Fire" got another cut few years after release, being shortened as result. "Takeoff Field of Fantasy" was renamed into "The Laugh" on that release.

References

External links
 Pasakas.net  

Pantomime
1980s children's television series
1990s children's television series
1980s animated television series
1990s animated television series
1980s Soviet television series
1990s Latvian television series
Latvian animated television series
Latvijas Televīzija original programming